Common names: Arabian horned viper, desert horned viper, Middle Eastern horned viper.

Cerastes gasperettii, commonly known as the Arabian horned viper, is a venomous viper species found especially in the Arabian Peninsula and north to Israel, Iraq, and Iran. It is very similar in appearance to C. cerastes, but the geographic ranges of these two species do not overlap. No subspecies of C. gasperettii are recognized.

Etymology
The specific name, gasperettii, is in honor of John Gasperetti, an American surveyor, engineer, and herpetologist, who collected the holotype specimen.

Description

Females are usually larger than males. The diet of C. gasperettii is thought to primarily consist of rodents, with insects, particularly beetles, and lizards making up a less significant component of their diets.

Geographic range
In the Arabian Peninsula C. gasperettii has been found in Saudi Arabia,  Kuwait, Oman, Qatar, United Arab Emirates, and Yemen. It is found in the Arava valley, located on the border between southern Israel and Jordan, eastwards through Jordan and Iraq to Khuzestan Province in southwestern Iran.

The type locality given is "Beda Azan [23°41'N., 53°28'E.], Abu Dhabi [Abū Zaby]" [United Arab Emirates].

References

Further reading

Farag AA, Banaja A (1980). "Amphibians and Reptiles from the western region of Saudi Arabia". Bull. Fac. Sci. King Aziz Univ., Riyad 4: 5-29.
Joger U (1984). The Venomous Snakes of the Near and Middle East. Wiesbaden: Dr. Ludwig Reichert Verlag. 175 pp. .
Leviton AE, Anderson SC (1967). "Survey of the reptiles of the Sheikdom of Abu Dhabi, Arabian Peninsula. Part II. Systematic account of the collection of reptiles made in the Sheikdom of Abu Dhabi by John Gasperetti". Proc. California Acad. Sci., Fourth Series 35: 157-192, 12 figures, 8 tables. (Cerastes cerastes gasperettii, new subspecies, pp. 183–186, Figure 12, Table 5).
Werner YL, Le Verdier A, Rosenman D, Sivan N (1991). "Systematics and zoogeography of Cerastes (Ophidia: Viperidae) in the Levant: 1. Distinguishing Arabian from African “Cerastes cerastes” ". The Snake 23: 90-100.

External links
 

Viperinae
Reptiles described in 1967
Fauna of Jordan
Snakes of Jordan
Flora of Palestine (region)
Fauna of the Middle East
Reptiles of the Arabian Peninsula